Ryan Thomas (born 1984) is an English actor.

Ryan Thomas may also refer to:

Ryan Thomas (fighter) (born 1984), mixed martial arts fighter
Ryan Thomas (soccer) (born 1989), American soccer player
Ryan Thomas (footballer) (born 1994), New Zealand football player
Ryan C. Thomas (born 1975), American author and editor
Ryan Thomas, TV character in Life Unexpected

See also

Thomas Ryan (disambiguation)